Elhamma is a genus of moths of the family Hepialidae. There are four described species found in Australia and New Guinea.

Species
Elhamma australasiae - Australia
Elhamma diakonoffi - New Guinea
Elhamma roepkei - New Guinea
Elhamma toxopeusi - New Guinea

External links
Hepialidae genera

Hepialidae
Exoporia genera
Taxa named by Francis Walker (entomologist)